Mary Claire Pugh is an applied mathematician known for her research on thin films, including the thin-film equation and Hele-Shaw flow. She is a professor of mathematics at the University of Toronto.

Pugh completed her Ph.D. in 1993 at the University of Chicago.
Before moving to Toronto, she worked at the Courant Institute of Mathematical Sciences at New York University and then as a faculty member at the University of Pennsylvania, where she won a Sloan Research Fellowship in 1999.

References

External links
Home page

20th-century American mathematicians
21st-century American mathematicians
American women mathematicians
Canadian mathematicians
Canadian women mathematicians
Applied mathematicians
University of Pennsylvania faculty
Academic staff of the University of Toronto
Sloan Research Fellows
Year of birth missing (living people)
Living people
20th-century American women
21st-century American women